During the French occupation of Moscow the 1812 Fire of Moscow persisted from 14 to 18 September 1812 and all but destroyed the city. The Russian troops and most of the remaining residents had abandoned Moscow on 14 September 1812 just ahead of French Emperor Napoleon's troops entering the city after the Battle of Borodino. The Moscow military governor, Count Fyodor Rostopchin, has often been blamed for organising the destruction of the sacred former capital to weaken the French army in the scorched city even more.

Background 
After continuing Barclay's "delaying operation" as part of his attrition warfare against Napoleon, Kutuzov used Rostopchin to burn most of Moscow's resources as part of a scorched earth strategy, guerilla warfare by the Cossacks against French supplies and total war by the peasants against French foraging. This kind of war without major battles weakened the French army at its most vulnerable point: military logistics. On 19 October 1812 the French army lacking provisions and being warned by the first snow abandoned the city voluntarily.

Regarding the state of Moscow itself, the city was mostly deserted, at least in comparison to its normal levels of population: At the beginning of 1812 Moscow had around 270,184 inhabitants according to a contemporary police survey; of these, somewhere between 6,200 and 10,000 civilians chose to remain in the city after the arrival of the French, in addition to between 10,000 and 15,000 sick or wounded Russian soldiers.

Causes 

Search had been made for the fire-engines since the previous day, but some of them had been taken away and the rest put out of action...The Poles reported that they had already caught some incendiaries and shot them, ...they had extracted the information that orders had been given by the Governor of the city and the police that the whole city should be burnt during the night.
Before leaving Moscow, Count Rostopchin supposedly gave orders to the head of police (and released convicts) to have the Kremlin and major public buildings (including churches and monasteries) set on fire. During the following days, the fires spread. According to Germaine de Staël, who left the city a few weeks before Napoleon arrived, and afterward corresponded with Kutuzov, it was Rostopchin who ordered his own mansions to be set on fire, so no Frenchmen should lodge in it. Today, the majority of historians blame the initial fires on the Russian strategy of scorched earth.

Furthermore, a Moscow police officer was captured trying to set the Kremlin on fire where Napoleon was staying at the time. Brought before Napoleon, the officer admitted he and others had been ordered to set the city on fire, after which he was bayonetted by guardsmen on the spot on the orders of a furious Napoleon.

The sight of the fire deeply disturbed Napoleon who was horrified and intimidated at the Russian resolution to destroy their most sacred and beloved city before surrendering it. A witness records him as remaining transfixed watching the fire from the Kremlin while saying: "What a terrible sight! And they did this themselves! So many palaces! What an incredible solution! What kind of people! These are Scythians!"

The catastrophe started as many small fires, which promptly grew out of control and formed a massive blaze. The fires spread quickly since most buildings in Moscow were made of wood. Although Moscow had had a fire brigade, their equipment had previously either been removed or destroyed on Rostopchin's orders. The flames spread into the Kremlin's arsenal, and was put out by French Guardsmen. The burning of Moscow is reported to have been visible up to 215 km, or 133 miles, away.

Tolstoy, in his book War and Peace, suggests that the fire was not deliberately set, either by the Russians or the French, but was the natural result of placing a deserted and mostly wooden city in the hands of invading troops. Before the invasion, fires would have started nearly every day even with the owners present and a fully functioning fire department, and the soldiers would start additional fires for their own needs, from smoking their pipes, cooking their food twice a day, and burning enemies' possessions in the streets. Some of those fires would inevitably get out of control, and without an efficient firefighting action, these individual building fires can spread to become neighborhood fires, and ultimately a citywide conflagration.

Timeline of events 

 7 September – Battle of Borodino;
 8 September – Russian army began retreating east from Borodino. They camped outside Mozhaysk. When the village of Mozhaysk was captured by the French on the 9th, the Grande Armée rested for two days to recover. Napoleon asked Berthier  to send reinforcements from Smolensk to Moscow and from Minsk to Smolensk.
 10 September – The main quarter of the Russian army was situated at Bolshiye Vyazyomy. Kutuzov settled in a manor on the high road to Moscow. The owner was Dmitry Golitsyn, who entered military service again. Russian sources suggest Mikhail Kutuzov wrote a number of orders and letters to Rostopchin about saving the city or the army.
 11 September – Tsar Alexander signed a document that Kutuzov was promoted General Field Marshall, the highest military rank. Napoleon wrote Marshal Victor to hurry to Moscow.
  the main forces of Kutuzov departed from the village, now Golitsyno and camped near Odintsovo, 20 km to the west, followed by Mortier and Joachim Murat's vanguard.  Eugene de Beauharnais attacked Savvino-Storozhevsky Monastery. Napoleon Bonaparte, who suffered from a cold and lost his voice, spent the night at Vyazyomy Manor (on the same sofa in the library) within 24 hours.
 13 September – Napoleon leaves the manor house and heads east. Napoleon and Józef Poniatowski also camped near Odintsovo and invited Murat for dinner. Russian army set camp at Fili; Russian vanguard lodged nearby in Dorogomilovo. On Sunday afternoon the Russian military council at Fili discussed the risks and agreed to abandon Moscow without fighting. Leo Tolstoy wrote Rostopchin was invited also and explained the difficult decision in quite a few remarkable chapters. The troops started at once. "They were passing through Moscow from two o'clock at night, till two in the afternoon and bore away with them the wounded and the last of the inhabitants who were leaving." The civilian flight from Moscow was organized by Miloradovich while Kutuzov kept a low profile during the retreat using side streets.
 14 September – The Russian army crossed the Moskva river near Sparrow Hills and marched through Moscow into a southeast bound road to Ryazan, followed by masses of civilians. Napoleon arrived at Poklonnaya Hill. After a ceasefire Murat's corps was the first to ride through the city, taking the Kremlin in the afternoon, leaving the inhabitants enough time to depart. First fires broke out in the evening.
 15 September – More wind and massive fires. Napoleon arrives at Kremlin. It was seven o'clock in the evening when suddenly a shot rang out from the Kaluga Gate. The enemy blew it up a powder magazine, which must have been the signal agreed upon; several rockets shoot up at once, and half an hour later a fire appeared in several blocks of the city. The wind changed direction and reached hurricane strength. Six or seven thousand little shops caught fire again.
 16 September – By four in the morning the firestorm threatens Kremlin. Watching the fire from Kremlin Hill, Napoleon relocated to the suburban and empty Petrovsky Palace in the afternoon. According to sergeant Adrien Bourgogne: "Orders had been given to shoot everyone found setting fire to houses. This order was executed at once. A little open space next to the Place du Gouvernement was called by us the Place des Pendus, as here a number of incendiaries were shot and hung on the trees."
 18 September – Fire destroys three-quarters of the city and settling down; when it begins to rain, Napoleon returns to the Kremlin. 
 19 September – Murat lost sight of Kutuzov who changed direction and turned west to Podolsk  and Tarutino where he would be more protected by the surrounding hills and the Nara river.
 20 September – Napoleon sends a message to propose peace to the Tsar who is based in Saint Petersburg.
 21 September – The fires are finally subsided.
 23 September – Order given for the two battalions of the 33rd Regiment to break away. As they were 'daily bothered by numerous pulks of Cossacks' Napoleon ordered to clean the area and forage with the assistance of the Dutch flying squadron.  On 25 September, in collaboration with German infantrymen and French dragoons, it had to sweep the area around Malye Vyaziomy.
 24 September – Dinners were held at the Kremlin, with promotions and ribbons, and a theatre was set up.
 26 September – After losing sight of the Russian army, Murat finally detects them near Podolsk.
 27 September – A ball was held. Everyone put on their newly acquired clothes and drank rum punch. First snowfall of the season; the French army is suffering from famine and the cold.
 28 September – A large supply of foodstuffs was seized at Malye Vyaziomy and loaded onto 26 wagons. They were pursued by Cossacks who managed to take 15 wagons.
 3 October – Kutuzov and his entire staff arrived at Tarutino. He wanted to go even further in order to control three-pronged roads from Obninsk, so that Napoleon could not turn south or southwest. Kutuzov avoided frontal battles involving large masses of troops. This tactic was sharply criticized by Chief of Staff Bennigsen and others, but also by the Autocrat and Emperor Alexander. Barclay de Tolly interrupted his service for five months and settled in Nizhny Novgorod. Each side avoided the other and seemed no longer to wish to get into a fight.
 4 October – A plan to march the French army to Saint Petersburg was given up; absolute lack of forage, limited cavalry and artillery as horses died on the spot. Murat and his cavalry arrived at Winkovo and settled near a lake, watching the Russian army, but he was forced to withdraw into a ravine. A network of Cossacks and armed peasants were killing all isolated men.
 5 October – On order of Napoleon, the French ambassador Jacques Lauriston leaves Moscow to meet Kutuzov at his headquarters near Tarutino. Kutuzov agreed to meet, despite the orders of the Tsar. Rostopchin owned an estate near Tarutino, Russia. Robert Wilson was with him, when Rostopchin set fire to his estate.
 7 October – Although the weather was fine and the temperature mild, not a single (French) courier from Moscow reached Vilnius, due to a lack of horses.
 8 October – Murat personally asked Miloradovich to let his cavalry go foraging.
 15 October – Napoleon ordered evacuation of the 12,000 sick and wounded to Smolensk.
 17 October – French columns again passed the Nara river and proceeded to their respective destinations.
 18 October – At dawn during breakfast, Murat's camp in a forest was surprised by an attack by forces led by Bennigsen, known as Battle of Winkovo. Bennigsen was supported by Kutuzov from his headquarters at distance. Murat loses 12 guns, 3,000 men, and 20 of his baggage carts.  Bennigsen asked Kutuzov to provide troops for the pursuit. However, the General Field Marshal refused.
 19 October – After 36 days, the French army (around 108,000) leaves Moscow at seven in the morning. Before he left, Mortier was to blow up the Kremlin, but the marshal did not have enough time to complete this task and only managed a small explosion. Napoleon made camp in the village of Troitsk, Moscow on the Desna River. Napoleon's goal was to get around Kutuzov, but on the 24th he was stopped at Maloyaroslavets on his way to Medyn and forced to go north on the 26th.

Extent of the disaster 

...In 1812, there had been approximately 4,000 stone structures and 8,000 wooden houses in Moscow. Of these, there remained after the fires only about 200 of the stone buildings and some 500 wooden houses along with about half of the 1,600 churches, although nearly every church was damaged to some extent...the large number of churches that escaped total destruction by the flames is probably explained by the fact that altar implements and other paraphernalia were made of precious metals, which immediately attracted the attention of the looters. Indeed, Napoleon had a systematic sweep made for the church silver, which ended up in his war chest, the mobile treasury.

The treatment of these Russians left behind, civilians or soldiers, by the French was mixed: According to a Russian source, they destroyed monasteries and blew up architectural monuments. Moscow churches were deliberately turned into stables and latrines. Priests who did not give up church shrines were murdered savagely, nuns were raped, and stoves were fired using ancient icons. On the other hand, Napoleon personally made sure that enough food was delivered to Moscow to feed all the Russians left behind who were fed regardless of sex or age.

Still, the remaining buildings had enough space for the French army. As General Marcellin Marbot reasoned: "It is often claimed that the fire of Moscow... was the principal cause of the failure of the 1812 campaign. This assertion seems to me to be contestable. To begin with, the destruction of Moscow was not so complete that there did not remain enough houses, palaces, churches, and barracks to accommodate the entire army [for a whole month]."

Reconstruction of the city 

The process of rebuilding after the fire under military governor Alexander Tormasov (1814–1819) and Dmitry Golitsyn (1820–ca 1840) was gradual, lasting well over a decade.

In culture 
 Leo Tolstoy describes the occupation and fire in his novel War and Peace (Book XI). 
 Kutuzov, Russian movie (1943) with English subtitles, describes also the Fire of Moscow (1812).
 The fire was adapted into 1965–67 Soviet film War and Peace; the film crew planned out the scenes for 10 months and shot the fires with six ground cameras while also filming from helicopters.

See also
List of battles of the French invasion of Russia

Notes

Bibliography

Further reading 

 Chambray, George de, Histoire de l'expédition de Russie  Chambray, George de, Histoire de l'expédition de Russie access-date=7 March 2021
 
 Clausewitz, Carl von, "Der Feldzug 1812 in Russland und die Befreiungskriege von 1813–15", 1906,  
 
 V. Fillipov, "Dynamics of ethnic and confessional identity of Moscow population", citing Russian edition of: На пути к переписи / Под редакцией Валерия Тишкова — М.: "Авиаиздат", 2003 с. 277–313 
 Холодковский В.М., Наполеон ли поджёг Москву?, «Вопросы истории», 1966, No. 4.
 Katayeva, I.M. "Fire of Moscow", citing Russian edition of "Отечественная война и русское общество", в 7тт, т.4, М, издание т-ва И.Д.Сытина, 1911 
 Martin, Alexander, Enlightened Metropolis: Constructing Imperial Moscow, 1762–1855, Oxford, Oxford University Press, 2013.
 Martin, Alexander, From the Holy Roman Empire to the Land of the Tsars: One Family's Odyssey, 1768-1870, Oxford, Oxford University Press, 2022.
 
 Olivier, Daria, The Burning of Moscow 1812, London. George Allen & Unwin Ltd. 1966 (JSTOR – The Scholarly Journal Archive review)
 Rosenstrauch, J.A., "Historische Ereignisse in Moskau im Jahre 1812 zur Zeit der Anwesenheit des Feindes in dieser Stadt" (German-language memoir text), in: И.А. Розенштраух, Исторические происшествия в Москве 1812 года во время присутствия в сем городе неприятеля, М., Новое Литературное Обозрение, 2015, pp. 169–220 – .
 
 
 Sytin, P.V. "History of Moscow Streets", citing original Russia edition: Сытин, П.В., "Из истории московских улиц", М, 1948.* Полосин И.И., Кутузов и пожар Москвы 1812 г., «Исторические записки», 1950, т. 34.
 Tarle, Yevgeny, "Napoleon's Invasion of Russia", citing Russian edition of: Тарле, Е.В., "Нашествие Наполеона на Россию", гл.VI "Пожар Москвы" at 
 Тартаковский А.Г., Обманутый Герострат. Ростопчин и пожар Москвы, «Родина», 1992, No. 6—7.
 

19th century in Moscow
1812
1812 in the Russian Empire
1812 fires in Europe
Urban fires in Europe
September 1812 events
French invasion of Russia